German Township is one of ten townships in Marshall County, Indiana, United States. As of the 2010 census, its population was 8,902 and it contained 3,433 housing units.

History
German Township was organized in 1838, and named for the fact the township originally was settled chiefly by Germans.

Geography

Cities, towns, villages
 Bremen

Major highways

Education
 Bremen Public Schools

German Township residents may obtain a free library card from the Bremen Public Library in Bremen.

Political districts
 Indiana's 2nd congressional district
 State House District 23
 State Senate District 9

References
 
 United States Census Bureau 2008 TIGER/Line Shapefiles
 IndianaMap

External links
 Indiana Township Association
 United Township Association of Indiana
 City-Data.com page for German Township

Townships in Marshall County, Indiana
Townships in Indiana